Vietnam Nurses is a 2005 television documentary directed by Polly Watkins. It tells the story of six Australian Army nurses who served in a field hospital in Vietnam between the years 1962 and 1972.


Interviewees
 Diane Badcock
 Anne Healey
 Maggie Hopcraft
 Jan McCarthy
 Terrie Ross
 Colleen Thurgar
 Barry Morgan

Awards
The film won an Australian Film Institute award in 2006 and received a further 3 nominations.

References

External links
 
 

2005 television films
2005 films
Australian documentary television films
Documentary films about health care
Documentary films about women in war
2005 documentary films
Documentary films about the Vietnam War
Military history of Australia during the Vietnam War
Military medicine in Australia
Vietnam War nurses
Women in the Vietnam War
2000s English-language films